The spiked Atlantic spiny-rat or Espirito Santo spiny rat (Trinomys paratus), is a spiny rat species from South America. It is found in Brazil.

References

Trinomys
Mammals described in 1948